Moma may refer to:

People 
 Moma Clarke (1869–1958), British journalist
 Moma Marković (1912–1992), Serbian politician
 Momčilo Rajin (born 1954), Serbian art and music critic, theorist and historian, artist and publisher

Places
 Angola
 Moma, Angola

 Mozambique
 Moma District, Nampula

 Russia
 Moma District, Russia, Sakha Republic
 Moma Natural Park, a protected area in Moma District
 Moma (river), a tributary of the Indigirka in Sakha Republic
 Moma Range, in Sakha Republic

Transport 
 Moma Airport, in Sakha Republic, Russia
 Moma Airport (Democratic Republic of the Congo), in Kasai-Occidental Province

Other uses 
 Moma (moth), an owlet moth genus
 Mars Organic Molecule Analyser, an instrument aboard the Rosalind Franklin Mars rover
 Mixed Groups of Reconstruction Machines, a Greek Army organization
 Modern Hungary Movement, a political party in Hungary
 Moma language, spoken in Indonesia
 Museum of Modern Art (disambiguation)
 Museum of Modern Art in New York
 San Francisco Museum of Modern Art

See also 
 Mama (disambiguation)
 Momas, a commune of France